René Chénier is a Canadian film producer and an executive producer for the National Film Board of Canada.

Chénier co-produced Benoît Pilon's 2008 film The Necessities of Life, and was nominated for the Genie Award for Best Motion Picture. In 2012, he won a Genie Award for Best Animated Short for Georges Schwizgebel's Romance.

From 2006, Chénier was an executive producer for the French animated studio for the National Film Board. In 2014, he was appointed executive producer for special projects.

References

External links

Film producers from Quebec
National Film Board of Canada people
Living people
Canadian animated film producers
French Quebecers
Year of birth missing (living people)